Adhe Neram Adhe Idam is a 2009 Indian Tamil-language romantic drama film written and directed by M. Prabhu and produced by Rama Krishnan. The film stars Jai and Vijayalakshmi, while Rahul Madhav, Nizhalgal Ravi, and Lollu Sabha Jeeva play supporting roles. The music was composed by Premji Amaren with editing by G. B. Venkatesh and cinematography by Sri Pawan Sekhar. The film released on 6 November 2009.

Plot
Karthik (Jai) falls in love with Janani (Vijayalakshmi). Although she is reluctant at first, she later accepts his love. After Janani's approval, Karthik goes to Australia as per his father states in order to finish his education. In the time that he had gone, Janani's parents arranged another groom for her, Siva (Rahul Madhav). Janani thought that Siva was more richer and handsome and would live a better life with him; therefore, she agrees to marry him. However, fate plays with them again. When Karthik is coming back from Australia, he meets a man. He chats with the man, and they soon become friends. He tells the man about his love story and how his lover had betrayed him for someone "better". The man tells him that the best way to teach her a lesson is to show vengeance and ruin her life. As a result of the man's advice, Karthik seeks revenge and forces Janani to sleep with him and other malicious actions. As the film progresses, the major plot twist is that the man that Karthik had met was actually Siva, who had been both a barrier and facilitator for their love to become united. In the climax, Janani tries to sleep with Karthik after being disappointed with Siva. However, in a sudden turn of events, Karthik kills her for betrayal but regrets it. Siva goes back sadly after coming to know that Janani is no more.

Cast
 Jai as Karthik
 Vijayalakshmi as Janani
 Rahul Madhav as Siva
 Nizhalgal Ravi as Karthik's father
 Lollu Sabha Jeeva as Jeeva
 Ravi Prakash

Soundtrack

The soundtrack features 5 songs composed by Premgi Amaren.

Reception
Sify stated that the film "defies all logic" and "The director?s desire for experimentation and the urge to break moulds blow up on his face as he has no proper script". Behindwoods wrote "Adhe Neram Adhe Idam is an effort that has missed its mark by quite some distance. The jaded narration, monotonous pace and lack of emotion will be the major factors that work against it." Rediff wrote "The real blame for such slipshod work must undoubtedly rest with the director, though this could easily have been a taut, superbly crafted emotional thriller. Instead, there's a serious dearth of logic, completely senseless characterisation and a climax that leaves you as puzzled as amused." Times of India wrote that "interestin plot that suffers from a lack of depth."

References

2009 films
2000s Tamil-language films
Indian romantic drama films
2009 romantic drama films
2009 directorial debut films
Films scored by Premgi Amaren